Love & Other Drugs is a 2010 American romantic comedy-drama film directed, produced and co-written by Edward Zwick and based on Jamie Reidy's 2005 non-fiction book Hard Sell: The Evolution of a Viagra Salesman.

Starring Jake Gyllenhaal, Anne Hathaway, Oliver Platt, Hank Azaria, Josh Gad and Gabriel Macht, the film tells the story of a medicine peddler in 1990s Pittsburgh who starts a relationship with a young woman suffering from an illness that leads to Parkinson's disease.

Love & Other Drugs was released in theaters on November 24, 2010, by 20th Century Fox and grossed $103 million against a $30 million budget.

Plot 
In 1996, womanizer Jamie Randall is fired from a Pittsburgh electronics store for having sex with his manager's girlfriend. His wealthy brother, Josh, refers him for a job as a pharmaceutical sales representative.

After attending a Pfizer training program, Jamie goes to work for them, attempting to get doctors to prescribe Zoloft. He is rebuffed, much to the dismay of his regional manager, Bruce, who sees him as his ticket to the Chicago market. Bruce suggests he get Dr. Stan Knight to prescribe Zoloft instead of Prozac, so other doctors will follow. Jamie tries to gain access to Dr. Knight by flirting with his female employees, while secretly discarding the Prozac samples.

Knight eventually allows Jamie to observe him examine one of his patients, Maggie Murdock, who suffers from early onset Parkinson's disease. Taking an interest in Maggie, Jamie obtains her number from one of Knight's assistants, whom he previously seduced.

Jamie and Maggie go on a date and agree that neither is interested in a serious relationship, so they start having casual sex. He is beaten up by top-selling Prozac rep, Trey Hannigan, who discovers that Jamie has been discarding his samples. Maggie reveals Trey is an ex-boyfriend, and she tells Jamie a rumor about Jamie's company developing a new drug to treat erectile dysfunction. Bruce confirms that Viagra is about to be marketed.

Jamie starts selling Viagra, which is an instant success. He reveals that he wants a serious relationship, but Maggie breaks up with him. He confronts her while she helps senior citizens onto a bus bound for Canada to obtain cheap prescription drugs. They argue, Jamie refuses to leave and waits for Maggie all night at a bus stop. Touched, she reciprocates feelings and they resume their relationship.

Maggie accompanies Jamie to a medical conference, where she ends up at a Parkinson's support group across the street. She invites Jamie, and he meets a man whose wife is in the final stages of the disease and asks for advice. The man tells him to leave her, citing the downsides of the disease over time. After the convention, Maggie tells Jamie how much she loves him. He begins researching Parkinson's and takes Maggie to different specialists around the country for tests. Jamie becomes angry when they arrive at an appointment only to discover it has been rescheduled. Feeling Jamie only wants to be with her if there is a hope for a cure, she breaks up with him.

Sometime later, Jamie and Josh are invited to a party by Knight, where Jamie takes Viagra and has a threesome with two women. He awakens with a rare side effect and goes to the hospital. Sometime later, he goes to a restaurant and encounters Maggie on a date. Bruce arrives and reveals Jamie has been promoted to the Chicago office.

While packing, Jamie finds the videotape recorder with the video of himself and Maggie talking about life. He realizes he wants to be with her, but her boss tells him she has left for Canada to obtain cheap prescription drugs. Jamie finds and tells her that he loves and needs her. She starts to cry, saying she will need him more. Jamie decides not to take the job in Chicago; instead, he attends medical school at the University of Pittsburgh to be with her.

Cast 

 Jake Gyllenhaal as Jamie Randall
 Anne Hathaway as Maggie Murdock
 Oliver Platt as Bruce Winston
 Hank Azaria as Dr. Stan Knight
 Josh Gad as Josh Randall
 Gabriel Macht as Trey Hannigan
 Judy Greer as Cindy
 George Segal as Dr. James Randall
 Jill Clayburgh as Nancy Randall
 Nikki DeLoach as Christy
 Katheryn Winnick as Lisa
 Natalie Gold as Dr. Helen Randall 
 Michael Chernus as Jerry
 Michael Buffer as Pfizer Convention MC 
 Bingo O'Malley as Sam 
 Jaimie Alexander as Carol (uncredited)

The film was a posthumous release for Jill Clayburgh who died November 5, 2010. The film was dedicated to her memory.

Production

Filming 
Principal photography began in the Pittsburgh, Pennsylvania region on September 21, 2009. The city was chosen for its atmosphere, rich medical history, the state's tax incentive program for film productions, and the area's experienced crews. Pittsburgh suburbs such as McCandless, Squirrel Hill, Fox Chapel, Sewickley, Aliquippa, and Brownsville have been used as locations for the film, as well as Mellon Arena, Jane Street in the South Side between 17th and 18th streets, the Omni William Penn Hotel, The Capital Grille, and Station Square. Pittsburgh doubled as Chicago for some scenes. The studio was in a building that had been a limousine car park.

The scene in the beginning of the film where Gyllenhaal's character works in the audio/video store was shot at the former Don Allen Car Dealership located on Baum Blvd and S. Atlantic Avenue where the East End neighborhoods of Shadyside, Friendship and Bloomfield intersect. The building has since been demolished as of 2014.

A section of the Mon-Fayette Expressway (Pennsylvania Route 43) in suburban Washington County was used for scenes on November 15–16, delaying traffic. A helicopter was used for filming and 40 to 50 vehicles were brought in for the shoot. Trailers and tents were set up on the campus of Ringgold High School while filming took place on the Expressway. An area was set aside for actors waiting to film their scenes.

In preparing for the film, Hathaway credits the work of Kate Winslet and Penélope Cruz, two actresses "whose work [she] returned to a lot in preparation" for Love and Other Drugs; she believes both have "done nudity with a tremendous amount of sensitivity and dignity". She identified one of her favorite Cruz films, Abre Los Ojos, as work that helped her greatly for her role. Like Gyllenhaal, Hathaway had final cut over those scenes, using it to cut five seconds where she thought "the camera lingered a little bit". Hathaway said that she did not believe her nudity in the film would put off socially conservative people who would otherwise see the film, saying "just because nudity is such a contentious issue in America people believe that they automatically alienate the conservative parts of America by having nudity. But I give the American public more credit than that. I think that people are curious and people do love love stories. I think people might find it and like it, even though it is a little bit risky."

Release

Critical response 

Love and Other Drugs received mixed reviews from critics. Rotten Tomatoes gave the film an approval rating of 49% based on 170 reviews, with an average rating of 5.78/10. The site's critical consensus reads, "It's a pleasure to see Hollywood produce a romance this refreshingly adult, but Love and Other Drugs struggles to find a balance between its disparate plot elements." Metacritic gave the film a score of 55 out of 100, based on 38 critics, indicating "mixed or average reviews".

Roger Ebert of the Chicago Sun-Times gave it two and a half stars out of four, commenting that it "obtains a warm, lovable performance from Anne Hathaway and dimensions from Jake Gyllenhaal that grow from comedy to the serious". Kirk Honeycutt of The Hollywood Reporter gave the film a mixed review, writing: "The energy is far too great—manic even—at the beginning but calms down for a while to focus on the highly competitive but not always ethical arena of drug sales, then gets distracted by unusually bold sex scenes for a studio picture only to wander off into the cultural phenomenon of Viagra before the movie decides it's a romance after all and so concludes in a highly conventional final embrace." A negative review from the East Bay Express described it as "a spectacularly maudlin and repellent piece of work" where the two protagonists "try to outdo each other in the 'who cares' department with their alarmingly off-putting interpersonal communication", leading to "callous salesman jokes, callous sex jokes, even callous jokes about the homeless man who rescues drug samples from the Dumpster." An Associated Press reviewer found the film to be a "run-of-the-mill Hollywood love story".

Betsy Sharkey of the Los Angeles Times gave the film a positive review, stating "Zwick is thankfully much more of a grown-up now in dealing with relationship entanglements. Somehow, between the epic and the intimate, between Hathaway and Gyllenhaal, love doesn't come easy, but with Love & Other Drugs, at least you don't have to wait." Mary Pols of Time stated, "Since American movies tend to be prudish about sex, especially having bona fide stars appear to do it onscreen, Love & Other Drugs''' desire to thoroughly acquaint us with a topless Anne Hathaway and a bottomless Jake Gyllenhaal is a welcome change." James Berardinelli, film critic for ReelViews, praised the film and its story, giving it three and a half stars out of four. He wrote, "The first thing one notices about Love and Other Drugs is that it's an adult romance. So many current love stories are targeted at teenagers that it's rare to find one that sidesteps the numerous contrivances that permeate the genre."

 Box office Love and Other Drugs was released on November 24, 2010, and opened in 2,455 theaters in the United States, grossing $2,239,489 on its opening day and $9,739,161 in its opening weekend, ranking  6 with a per theater average of $3,967. On its second weekend, it remained  6 and grossed $5,652,810, averaging $2,300 per theater. By its third weekend it dropped down to  8 and made $2,981,509, averaging $1,331 per theater.

The film had a domestic total gross of $32,367,005 against a production budget of $30 million. It fared much better overseas, where it grossed $70,453,003.

 Accolades 

 References 

 External links 
 
 
 Love & Other Drugs'' at The Numbers

2010 films
2010 romantic comedy-drama films
2010s English-language films
2010s sex comedy films
20th Century Fox films
American romantic comedy-drama films
American sex comedy films
Casual sex in films
Dune Entertainment films
Films about drugs
Films based on non-fiction books
Films directed by Edward Zwick
Films produced by Scott Stuber
Films scored by James Newton Howard
Films set in 1996
Films set in Pittsburgh
Films shot in Pittsburgh
Regency Enterprises films
2010s American films
Films about disability